The Navotas Polytechnic College also referred to by its acronym NPC,  is a public, non-sectarian, coeducational higher education institution  run by the city government of Navotas in Navotas City, Metro Manila, Phiippines. It was founded in 1994 by virtue of Municipal Ordinance (M.O). No. 94-06 of the Municipal Council of Navotas (now City of Navotas), which was signed on May 18, 1994.

In over 15 years of existence, the Navotas Polytechnic College has grown into a respected public type college in Navotas.
At present NPC offers degree programs in business administration, education, computer technology, short-term courses.

History
The Navotas Polytechnic College was established by virtue of Municipal Ordinance (M.O). No. 94-06 of the Municipal Council of Navotas (now City of Navotas), which was signed on May 18, 1994.

The primary goal of the college is to give opportunity to the poor but deserving students of Navotas, to allow them to pursue tertiary education and acquire knowledge and skills through excellence in academic and technological courses so they can live with dignity as humane persons and as members of the community who can contribute to the growth and advancement of Navotas and of the Filipino nation as a whole.

Education

College of Education
 Bachelor in Elementary Education (BEED), area of concentration: General Education
 Bachelor of Secondary Education (BSED), majors in Mathematics; English

College of Business Administration
Bachelor of Science in Business Major in:
 Management Accounting (BSBAMA)
 Management (BSBA)
 Marketing Management (BSBA MKTGMGT)
 Human Resource Development Management (BSBAHRDM)

College of Computer Studies
 Bachelor of Science in Computer Science

Short-term courses
 Associate in Computer Secretarial (ACS)
 Computer Systems Programming (CSP)
 Computer Systems and Network Technician (CSNT)

Student organizations
 Reserve Officers Training Corps Alumni Association headed by Marvin Linatoc
 Junior Philippine Institute of Accountants (JPIA)
 United Business Administration Society (UBAS)
 Integrated Computer Society (ICS)
 The Torch (beed-torch)
 The Bosses (bsed-bosses)
 The TOFAZ (acs-ascsec- OFFAD)

Publication
Katig is the newspaper published by the Student Publication Organization with the help of Ms. Ellen Carlos through the College Administration Office. Katig gathers news stories that concern the NPC community. The Katig — contributed to by the schools offices and colleges — can be about major events, improvements to NPC's physical and academic features, information link between and among students and sectors of the college. It tackles local and national issues, as well.

External links
Navotas city government website

Educational institutions established in 1994
Local colleges and universities in Metro Manila
Education in Navotas
1994 establishments in the Philippines